Arnold (Arnoul) of Soissons or Arnold or Arnulf of Oudenburg (c. 1040–1087) is a saint of the Catholic Church, the patron saint of hop-pickers, Belgian brewers.

Biography
Arnold, born in Brabant, the son of a certain Fulbertus was first a career soldier before settling at the Benedictine St. Medard's Abbey, Soissons, France. He spent his first three years as a hermit, but later rose to be abbot of the monastery. His hagiography states that he tried to refuse this honor and flee, but was forced by a wolf to return. He then became a priest and in 1080, bishop of Soissons, another honor that he sought to avoid. When his see was occupied by another bishop, rather than fighting, he took the opportunity to retire from public life, founding the Abbey of St. Peter in Oudenburg.

As abbot in Oudenburg, Arnold brewed beer, as essential in medieval life as water.  He encouraged local peasants to drink beer, instead of water, due to its "gift of health". During the process of brewing the water was boiled and thus freed of pathogens, making the beer safer to drink.  The beer normally consumed at breakfast and during the day at this time in Europe was called small beer, having a very low alcohol content, and containing spent yeast. It is likely that people in the local area normally consumed small beer from the monastery, or made their own small beer at the instructions of Arnold and his fellow monks. During one outbreak of sickness, Arnold advised the local people to avoid consuming water, in favor of beer, which advice effectively saved lives.

One miracle tale says, at the time of an epidemic, rather than stand by while the local people fell ill from drinking water, Arnold had them consume his monastery brews. Because of this, many people in his church survived the plague. This same story is also told of Arnulf or Arnold of Metz, another patron of brewers.

Legacy
There are many depictions of St. Arnold with a mashing rake in his hand, to identify him. For example, the label on "Steenbrugge Abbey" beers has a picture of St Arnold holding a mash rake.

Arnold is honoured in July with a parade in Brussels on the "Day of Beer."

St. Arnold's feast day is 14 August.

See also
Saint Amand - patron saint of wine makers, brewers and bartenders
Arnulf of Metz - another patron saint of brewers

References

Further reading

External links
"St. Arnoul, or Arnulphus, Bishop of Soissons, Confessor", Butler's Lives of the Saints
Arnold and other patron saints of beer

1040s births
1087 deaths
Medieval French saints
Bishops of Soissons
11th-century Christian saints